Morlac is a commune in the Cher department in the Centre-Val de Loire region of France.

Geography
The river Arnon flows through the southern part of the commune.

Population

Sights
 The church of St. Martin, dating from the twelfth century
 Traces of a medieval abbey.
 The chateau Gaillard.
 A watermill.

See also
Communes of the Cher department

References

Communes of Cher (department)